Austrogramme is a genus of ferns in the subfamily Pteridoideae of the family Pteridaceae.

Species
, Plants of the World Online and the Checklist of Ferns and Lycophytes of the World recognized the following species:
Austrogramme asplenioides (Holttum) Hennipman
Austrogramme boerlageana (Alderw.) Hennipman
Austrogramme decipiens (Mett.) Hennipman
Austrogramme francii (Rosenst.) Hennipman
Austrogramme luzonica (Alderw.) M.Kato
Austrogramme marginata E.Fourn.

References

Pteridaceae
Fern genera